Mnong may refer to:
the Mnong people
the Mnong language